William George Black  (23 December 1857 – 21 December 1932) was a Scottish antiquary, lawyer and politician from Glasgow.

The son of a Glasgow solicitor, he was educated at Glasgow University, of which he was honorary LL.D. He contested South Aberdeen in 1906, and the Elgin Burghs and Islington West in 1910 as a Liberal Unionist. He was formerly a member of the Committee of Management of the Philip Stott College (Unionist Association), and was chairman of the Glasgow Good Government League. He travelled widely in India and the Far East. He was a trustee and a member of the executive of the Navy League and chairman of the Glasgow and West of Scotland branch. His First World War work, for which he was made CBE, was especially concerned with V.A.D. committees, disabled officers, and the post-War training of officers.

Mr. Black presented to the city of Glasgow in 1930 the re-erected Mercat Cross; he had written works on Scottish mercat crosses. He wrote other works on folk-medicine, Glasgow archaeology, and a description of Heligoland and the islands of the North Sea. His law books included works on Lands Agents Act, local government in Scotland, the parochial ecclesiastical law of Scotland, a digest of decisions in Scottish shipping cases, and the history of teinds. He was F.S.A. (London and Scotland), a former president of the Glasgow Archaeological Society. In Glasgow he was vice-chairman of St Mungo's College and chairman of the Ophthalmic Institution, and was active in other educational and charitable institutions. His wife, who was a daughter of Robert Blackie, the publisher, died in 1920. His wife's young nephews and nieces found him a tedious adult visitor to their home and they invented this irreverent ditty which could be sung to the tune of "The Ash Grove". 
"Rejected by Heaven,  From Hell given the sack,  He came  back to Earth,  As William George Black"

Attribution
Obituary. The Times, Friday, Dec 23, 1932; Issue 46324; pg. 12; col D — Mr. W. G. Black

Scottish antiquarians
1857 births
1932 deaths
Commanders of the Order of the British Empire
Liberal Unionist Party parliamentary candidates